Jacob (Yakov) Zhitomirsky (party alias Otsov; Okhrana aliases Andre and Daudet) was a prominent Bolshevik best known for being a secret agent of the Okhrana.

Biography 
He was recruited by Okhrana in 1902, while studying at the University of Berlin. Zhitomirsky was active in Berlin RSPLP group, reporting its activities to the Russian police, until 1907 when Bolsheviks were expelled from Berlin by German authorities and Zhitomirsky moved to Paris. 

He attended 5th RSDLP Congress in London.

In 1908 he was given twenty 500-ruble notes by the people involved in the 1907 Tiflis bank robbery. Unable to exchange notes, he passed this money to the vice-director of the Russian Department of Police Vissarionov, during his visit to Paris.

During World War I he served as a doctor with the Russian Expeditionary Force in France and reported about revolutionary propaganda among the Russian troops.

References
 V.K. Agafonov. Zagranichnaia okhranka.
 E. Shcherbakova. Agenturnaia Rabota Politicheskoi Politsii Rossiiskoi Imperii : Sbornik Dokumentov : 1880-1917 [The Intelligence service in the political police of the Russian Empire: Document collection: 1880-1917]. Moscow, St. Petersburg: AIRO-XXI, Dmitrii Bulanin, 2006. .

Year of birth missing
20th-century deaths
Year of death missing
Okhrana informants
Double agents
Russian Jews
Bolsheviks